The 2012–13 Dutch Basketball League was the 53rd season of the Dutch Basketball League, the highest professional basketball league in the Netherlands. The season started on 6 October 2012 and ended on 23 May 2013.

Second-seeded ZZ Leiden won the DBL title, after defeating fourth-seeded Aris Leeuwarden 4–0 in the play-off finals. EiffelTowers Den Bosch player Andre Young was voted the Most Valuable Player of the regular season.

Teams 
Apollo Amsterdam and Den Helder Kings entered the DBL for the 2012–13 season to bring the number of teams to ten.

Arenas and locations
{| class="wikitable sortable"  
|-
! Club
! Location
! Venue
! Capacity
|-
| Apollo Amsterdam || Amsterdam || Apollohal  || align=center | 1,500
|-
| Aris Leeuwarden || Leeuwarden ||  Kalverdijkje || align=center | 1,700
|-
| Stepco BSW || Weert || Sporthal Boshoven || align=center | 1,000
|-
|  Den Helder Kings || Den Helder || KingsDome || align=center |1,500
|-
|  GasTerra Flames || Groningen || MartiniPlaza  || align=center | 4,350
|-
|  EiffelTowers Den Bosch || 's-Hertogenbosch || Maaspoort  || align=center | 2,800
|-
|  Rotterdam Basketbal College || Rotterdam || Topsportcentrum Rotterdam || align=center | 1,000
|-
|  Landstede Basketbal || Zwolle || Landstede Sportcentrum || align=center | 1,200
|-
| ZZ Leiden || Leiden || Vijf Meihal || align=center | 2,000
|}

Regular season

Table

Results

* means win after overtime.

Playoffs
See 2013 DBL Playoffs.

Awards

Statistical leaders

Individual leaders

Team statistics

References

 
Dutch Basketball League seasons
1
Netherlands